Tarik Dam is a dam on the Sefīd-Rūd river in the Alborz mountain range, about  south of Rasht in Gilan Province, northern Iran. 

The dam was completed in 1977 to distribute releases from the Sefidrud Dam for irrigation and river regulation purposes.

A hydroelectric power station, with an installed capacity of 2.8 MW, was under construction in 2013 as part of the dam's structure.

See also

 
 List of power stations in Iran

References

Dams in Gilan Province
Hydroelectric power stations in Iran
Alborz (mountain range)
Buildings and structures in Gilan Province
Dams completed in 1977
Energy infrastructure completed in 2016
1977 establishments in Iran